The Damallsvenskan, Swedish for ladies all-Swedish and also known as OBOS Damallsvenskan for sponsorship reasons, is the highest division of women's football in Sweden. It is also referred to as the women's Allsvenskan. The term Allsvenskan alone is used to reference the men's division.

The division consists of a league of 14 teams. From 2013, the Damallsvenskan began operating on a system of promotion and relegation with the Elitettan. The two lowest placed teams are relegated to the Elitettan, and the two highest placed teams from the Elitettan are promoted in their place. Starting with the 2022 season the league has been expanded from 12 to 14 teams.

The first Swedish women's national championship was played in 1973. Since its inception, the Damallsvenskan has featured star players like Marta, Daniela, Nadine Angerer, Lisa De Vanna, Hope Solo, Christen Press, and Hanna Ljungberg. It's also the first women's domestic league to turn professional since its inception in 1988.

The top three teams in the Damallsvenskan qualify for the UEFA Women's Champions League.

Organization

2023 clubs and stadiums

Note: 1 According to each club information page at the Swedish Football Association website for Damallsvenskan.

Media coverage
Games from the 2022 Damallsvenskan are broadcast on the Swedish sports television channel, Viaplay. International viewers can subscribe on Fanseat.

Previous winners

The list of Swedish champions (1973–87) and winners of the Damallsvenskan (1988–present):

From 1988 to 1992 a play-off round was played. The top four teams after the regular season played a semi-final and final.

Malmö FF, LdB FC Malmö and FC Rosengård are the same club.

Player records

Top scorers
The following is a list of top scorers (skyttedrottningar) by season. Lena Videkull has won the award a record five times, while Hanna Ljungberg holds the record for most goals in a season with 39.

See also

 Svenska Cupen (women)
 Women's football around the world
 Diamantbollen
 List of sporting events in Sweden

References

External links

Official website

 
1
Summer association football leagues
1988 establishments in Sweden
Sports leagues established in 1988
Swed
Professional sports leagues in Sweden